The Nepal national rugby union team (Nepali:नेपाल राष्ट्रिय रग्बी युनियन टीम represents Nepal in international rugby union. Nepal is a member of the International Rugby Board (NRB).

History
Rugby is going to be played between Nepal and Bangladesh from 21 to 22 June 2022 at Army Stadium, Dhaka. A team of 25 from Nepal including players, coach, manager and a physio will leave for Bangladesh on 18 June, Saturday. The Rugby 7s and Rugby 15s matches will be played.

Nepali team lost against to Bangladesh team in the first international match on 21 June 2022. This match was an official international friendly match.

Records

Overall

Players Records
First International Score in Official Match:Birat Shrestha on (21 June 2022)

Captains
The following players have captained Nepal in the recent past:

Coaches
The following coaches have led Germany in the recent past:

Recent matches
Matches played in the last 12 months.

Current squad
Squad for the Bangladesh-Nepal International Rugby series 2022.

Suraj Chaudhary
Sher bahadur Wali
Bikram Bharati
Roshan Gharti
Niroj Karki
Bikram Puri
Nabin Maharjan
Shree Ram Shrestha
Birat Shrestha
Bibesh Basu
Sanjib Kunwar

Prem Bahadur Koirala
Ramit Bahadur Mal
Yadu Adhikari
Amar Sing Shrestha
Krishna Chhetri
Suman Chaulagain
Pujan Phewali
Jhukendra Rai
Ram Kishor Chaudhary
Sujan Kumal
Hutraj Pradhan

References

External links
nepalrugby.com

R
Rugby
Rugby union in Nepal